The Sublime and Beautiful is a 2014 American drama film directed by Blake Robbins, starring Blake Robbins, Laura Kirk, Matthew Del Negro, Armin Shimerman and Anastasia Baranova.

Cast
 Blake Robbins as David Conrad
 Laura Kirk as Kelly Conrad
 Matthew Del Negro as Mike Embree
 Armin Shimerman as Lee Weston
 Anastasia Baranova as Katie
 Molly Robbins as Elizabeth Conrad
 Emily Robbins as Samantha Conrad
 Copper Robbins as Jack Conrad

Release
The film premiered at Slamdance Film Festival on 17 January 2014.

Reception
Mark Bell of Film Threat called the film "thoughtful and intriguing" and wrote that it "deserves much attention." John Ford of SLUG Magazine called the film "sublime and beautiful". Kenneth R. Morefield of Christianity Today wrote that the film "address psychological and spiritual themes with sensitivity and shows compassion towards those who struggle through one of life's most intensely painful losses."

Justin Lowe of The Hollywood Reporter called Robbin's skills as a director "serviceable rather than distinctive" and "further limited by the film’s obvious budgetary constraints." Ronnie Scheib of Variety wrote that while Robbins’ acting "sounds no false notes", the "unbroken monotony of the proceedings, while arguably realistic, makes for heavy sledding cinematically."

References

External links
 
 

American drama films
2014 drama films